Justice Carpenter may refer to:

Alonzo P. Carpenter (1829–1898), associate justice of the New Hampshire Supreme Court
Elisha Carpenter (1824–1897), associate justice of the Connecticut Supreme Court
George Moulton Carpenter Jr. (1844–1896), associate justice of the Rhode Island Supreme Court
Thomas Preston Carpenter (1804–1876), associate justice of the Supreme Court of New Jersey